Kondapalli may refer to:

Kondapalli, a village in Krishna  district of Andhra Pradesh, India
Kondapalle, East Godavari district, a village in East Godavari district of Andhra Pradesh, India
Kondapalli Fort, a fort in Kondapalli village of Krishna district in Andhra Pradesh, India
Kondapally Toys, popular toys made in Kondapalli village of Krishna district in Andhra Pradesh, India
Kondapalli Seetharamaiah, a communist leader in India.